The 2013–14 PSV Eindhoven season saw PSV competing in the Eredivisie, KNVB Cup, UEFA Champions League and the UEFA Europa League. PSV finished the season in 4th place in the Eredivisie, qualifying for the UEFA Europa League again, were knocked out of the KNVB Cup by Roda JC in the Third Round. In Europe PSV were knocked out of the Champions League at the Play-off Round by A.C. Milan, ending up in the Europa League group stages, from which they did not progress.

Phillip Cocu was appointed as the team's coach at the start of the season, replacing Dick Advocaat.

Squad

 (on loan from Manchester City)

 (on loan from Fulham)

 (on loan from Queens Park Rangers)

Players out on loan

Transfers

Summer

In:

Out:

Winter

In:

Out:

Competitions

Eredivisie

Results summary

Results by round

Matches

League table

KNVB Cup

UEFA Champions League

Qualifying rounds

UEFA Europa League

Group stage

Squad statistics

Appearances and goals

|-
|colspan="14"|Players away from PSV on loan:
|-
|colspan="14"|Players who appeared for PSV no longer at the club:

|}

Goal scorers

Disciplinary record

References

PSV Eindhoven seasons
Psv Eindhoven
Psv Eindhoven
Psv Eindhoven